UDEAC may refer to:

Economic Community of Central African States
Special Administrative Unit of Civil Aeronautics